Penicillium pasqualense is a species of the genus of Penicillium.

References 

pasqualense
Fungi described in 2011